CapturaTalk was an assistive technology software developed by Mobispeech, a joint venture by Iansyst Ltd and Raspberry Software Ltd. When installed on a mobile phone or tablet device, CapturaTalk allowed the user to take a picture of a text heavy image to have it converted to speech and read aloud. The Mobispeech software was primarily designed to aid people who either required literacy support for disabilities such as dyslexia or for students learning English.

Apart from capturing pictures containing text that a user required converted to speech, CapturaTalk also incorporated the Oxford English Dictionary and was able to read out documents, text messages, contacts, internet pages, PDF files and e-mails received or opened on the phone or tablet.

CapturaTalk won the Handheld Learning Award for Innovation in the Special Needs & Inclusion Category at the Handheld Learning Conference 2009 and was also featured by the BBC in 2009.

The software was compatible with devices operating on Windows Mobile Professional (touchscreen, 2 megapixel camera, 65 MB storage) and Windows Mobile 5.0 or higher.

CapturaTalk version 3 was released in March 2010, following its preview at the BETT show in January 2010. A free upgrade was available for users who purchased version 2.

While CapturaTalk for the Windows platform has since been halted, an Android version was released in January 2012

References

External links
 CapturaTalk.com

Communication software